Old Street is a  street in inner north-east Central London that runs west to east from Goswell Road in Clerkenwell, in the London Borough of Islington, via St Luke's and Old Street Roundabout, to the crossroads where it meets Shoreditch High Street (south), Kingsland Road (north) and Hackney Road (east) in Shoreditch in the London Borough of Hackney.

It has London Underground station Old Street on the Northern line which has other platforms for National Rail's Northern City Line.

Its west half is inside London's Congestion Charging Zone; a short part of its eastern half is the inner ring marking its limit.

History

Old Street was recorded as Ealdestrate in about 1200, and le Oldestrete in 1373. As befits its name there are some suggestions that the road is of ancient origin. It lies on the route of an old Roman or possibly pre-Roman track connecting Silchester and Colchester, skirting round the walls of Londinium, today the areas known as the City of London.

The western part was widened between 1872 and 1877, but it narrows east of Coronet Street; there survive, at №s. 340-342 on the south side of the street and  №s. 323 and 325-329 on the north side, some domestic buildings from the eighteenth and early nineteenth century, though somewhat battered and altered in function. At the east end of Old Street there is a notable deviation of the line of the street as it joins the old Roman Road north to York. This deviation is visible on old maps but unexplained, and is today fronted by Shoreditch Town Hall and the former Shoreditch Magistrates Court (now a hotel). Together with St Leonard's, Shoreditch at the east end of Old Street, this was the civic hub of the former Metropolitan Borough of Shoreditch.

The eastern half of the road is on the London Inner Ring Road and forms part of the boundary of the London congestion charge zone. Old Street and the surrounding areas of Hoxton Square and Great Eastern Street host a thriving night life. The street and its adjacent areas have attracted IT and tech companies, both established and start-ups, and Old Street Roundabout, located at the junction with City Road, has been dubbed Silicon Roundabout. Old Street station is located under the roundabout. With the increase in passenger numbers using the station, in 2014 Transport for London announced that it was to offer pop-up retail space there as part of a drive to increase its revenue.

Within the past few years Old Street has become favoured for notable graffiti artists such as Banksy and Jef Aérosol. Banksy has featured several pieces on "Shoreditch Bridge".

Notes 
Bridget Cherry and Nikolaus Pevsner (1998) London: North. London: Penguin Books.
Ben Weinreb and Christopher Hibbert (1983) "Old Street" in The London Encyclopedia.

Transport
Old Street is served greatly by bus routes:

55: Walthamstow - Oxford Circus via Clapton
243: Wood Green - Waterloo via Dalston
N55: Woodford Wells - Oxford Circus via Clapton
205: Paddington - Bow via Angel
214: Moorgate - Highgate via Camden Town
Briefly:
242: Homerton Hospital - Aldgate via Dalston
271: Highgate - Moorgate via Holloway

In fiction

In the Charles Dickens novel Bleak House the lawyer's clerk Mr Guppy lunches in Old Street with Richard Carstone on 'lobster and lettuce, without the slugs this time'.

References

Streets in the London Borough of Islington
Streets in the London Borough of Hackney
High-technology business districts in the United Kingdom
Information technology places
Shoreditch